Morning After is the second studio album by Canadian R&B duo Dvsn. It was released on October 13, 2017, by OVO Sound and Warner Bros. Records.

Background
The lead single "Mood" was released on September 5, 2017, which they announced on Instagram. A teaser was revealed by dvsn on Instagram about the album on August 29, 2017. The official artwork was released in the form of a 'movie poster-like' image. In June 2017, they shared the song "Don't Choose", which was included as a single.

Track listing
Credits adapted from Tidal.

Notes
  signifies a co-producer
  signifies an additional producer
 "P.O.V." is an abbreviation for 'Point Of View'
 "Run Away" and "Conversations in a Diner" features background vocals from Amoy Levy, Camille Harrison, Rahiem Hurlock, Renee Rowe and Shantel May Marquardt
 "Nuh Time / Tek Time" features additional vocals from Delilah and spoken vocals from Sabrina Brown
 "Keep Calm" features background vocals from Amoy Levy, Camille Harrison and Shantel May Marquardt
 "Don't Choose" features background vocals from Partynextdoor
 "Claim" features background vocals from Noël Cadastre and additional vocals from Brian Morgan

Sample credits
 "Keep Calm" contains a sample of "Slow Dance", written by Curtis Gadson, Roz Newberry and Ron Sanders and performed by David Ruffin
 "P.O.V." contains a sample of "Fortunate", written by Robert Kelly and performed by Maxwell

Personnel
Credits adapted from Tidal.

Performers
 Dvsn – primary artist

Technical
 Greg Moffett – recording engineer , assistant mixing engineer 
 David "DC" Garcia – recording engineer 
 Chris Athens – mastering engineer 
 Noel "Gadget" Campbell – mixing engineer 
 Harley Arsenault – assistant mixing engineer 
 Devon Brooks – recording engineer 
 Kevin Dietz – recording engineer 
 Noah "40" Shebib – mixing engineer 
 David "Prep" Hughes – recording engineer 

Instruments
 Dalton 'D10' Tennant – keyboard 
 Adrian X – solo guitar 

Production
 Nineteen85 – producer 
 Maneesh – producer 
 40 – co-producer , producer 
 Noël – producer , co-producer 
 Robin Hannibal – producer 
 Alpha – co-producer

Charts

References

2017 albums
Dvsn albums
Albums produced by Nineteen85
Albums produced by Noah "40" Shebib
OVO Sound albums
Warner Records albums